ELCA may refer to:

Historic trail
 El Camino Real de Tierra Adentro

Religious organizations
 Evangelical Lutheran Church in America, largest Lutheran body in the United States
 Evangelical Lutheran Church of Australia, a predecessor to the Lutheran Church of Australia
Evangelical Lutheran Church (United States) (1917-1960) (then sometimes called ELCA, formerly the Norwegian Lutheran Church of America)
Eielsen Synod, the former Evangelical Lutheran Church in America

Medical procedure
 Excimer Laser Coronary Angioplasty

Other
 Enforcement of Limitations on Community Activities